Isaah Ferguson-Yeo (born 6 November 1994) is an Australian professional rugby league footballer who plays as a  and  forward for the Penrith Panthers in the NRL and Australia at international level. 

At representative level he has played for New South Wales Country and New South Wales in the State of Origin series. He is a dual NRL Premiership-winning Captain of 2021 and 2022. As of 2021, he is also the co-captain alongside his teammate Nathan Cleary. Yeo played  in the early part of his career before settling into the forwards full-time.

Early life
Yeo was born in Dubbo, New South Wales, Australia. He is the son of former North Sydney Bears and Balmain Tigers player Justin Yeo.

Yeo played his junior football for the St Johns, Dubbo and Dubbo CYMS, before being signed by the Penrith Panthers.

Playing career

Yeo played for Penrith's NYC team in 2013. Yeo played in Penrith's 2013 NYC Grand Final 42-30 win over the New Zealand Warriors.

2014
In round 1 of the 2014 NRL season, Yeo made his NRL debut for the Penrith club against Newcastle. Yeo scored his first career try in the Penrith club's 38-12 win over Parramatta in round 12. On 9 July 2014, Yeo was selected for the NSW residents team to play against the Queensland residents team at Suncorp Stadium. He played right-, i.e. number 3, and scored a try in the NSW 16-24 loss. Yeo finished his debut year in the NRL with him playing in 10 matches and scoring two tries.

2015
On 31 January and 1 February, Yeo played for Penrith in the 2015 NRL Auckland Nines. He finished off the 2015 season having played in 21 matches and scoring two tries for the Penrith club.

2016
In February 2016, Yeo was named in the Penrith's 2016 NRL Auckland Nines squad. On 11 February 2016, Yeo extended his contract with the Penrith club from the end of 2016 to the end of 2019. On 8 May 2016, Yeo played for New South Wales Country against New South Wales City, playing on the wing in the 30-44 loss in Tamworth. Yeo finished the 2016 NRL season with him playing in 26 matches and 5 tries for the Penrith club.

2017
In February 2017, Yeo was named as the captain of Penrith's 2017 NRL Auckland Nines squad, The Panthers were the runner-ups of the tournament, losing to the Sydney Roosters 10-8 in the final.

2018
Yeo made 26 appearances for Penrith and scored 4 tries in 2018 as the club finished 5th on the table at the end of the regular season.  Penrith reached the second week of the finals for the third season running but were eliminated by the Cronulla-Sutherland Sharks 21-20 with Yeo scoring a try in the defeat.

2019
Yeo began the 2019 as one of Penrith's first choice second-rowers and played in the club's opening round loss against Parramatta.  Yeo was taken from the field after being hit in a high tackle by Michael Jennings.  The following week, Yeo scored a try in Penrith's victory over Newcastle but was taken from the field after suffering another concussion.  In Round 8 against Canberra, Yeo was taken from the field with a shoulder injury during the club's 30-12 loss.

Yeo made a total of 18 appearances for Penrith in the 2019 NRL season as the club finished a disappointing 10th on the table and missed out on the finals for the first time since 2015.

2020
Yeo enjoyed his best year at Penrith in the 2020 NRL season as the club won the Minor Premiership and reached the 2020 NRL Grand Final.  On 19 October, he was named Dally M Lock of the year. Yeo played in the grand final which Penrith lost 26-20 against Melbourne.  Following the game, Yeo was named in the preliminary State of Origin side for New South Wales.

In Game 2 of the 2020 State of Origin series, Yeo made his debut off the bench for New South Wales in a 34-10 win.  He was selected for Game 3 where New South Wales lost the game 20-14 and the series 2-1 against Queensland.

2021 
During the 2021 pre-season, it was announced that Yeo would become co-captain alongside Nathan Cleary. This announcement came after the previous captain; James Tamou, departed the club for the Wests Tigers.

Yeo was selected in the 2021 State of Origin series at Lock for New South Wales. He played all three games in the series and was a part of the winning side as NSW reclaimed the Origin Shield.

On 25 September (alongside his Co-Captain Nathan Cleary), Yeo led the Penrith club to a 10-6 Preliminary Final victory over Melbourne, earning Penrith their second NRL Grand Final in two years.

On 27 September, Yeo was once again named Dally M Lock of the year for the second year in a row.

On 3 October, Yeo helped lead the Penrith club to their third premiership. With a final score of 14-12, Penrith held out a late barrage by South Sydney Yeo played all 80 minutes, making 168 metres, 57 post-contact metres and 36 tackles

2022
On 29 May, Yeo was selected by New South Wales to play in game one of the 2022 State of Origin series. Yeo played in all three games as New South Wales lost the series 2-1.

Yeo played 23 games for Penrith in the 2022 NRL season including the clubs 2022 NRL Grand Final victory over Parramatta.

In October he was named in the Australia squad for the 2021 Rugby League World Cup.
Yeo played for Australia in their 2021 Rugby League World Cup final victory over Samoa.

2023
On 18 February, Yeo played in Penrith's 13-12 upset loss to St Helens RFC in the 2023 World Club Challenge.

Honours

Penrith Panthers
NRL Premiership: 2021, 2022
NSW State Cup: 2014
NYC Premiership: 2013

Individual
Dally M Lock of the Year: 2020, 2021, 2022
Dally M Captain of the Year: 2022
Merv Cartwright Medal: 2018
John Farragher Award for Courage and Determination: 2017

New South Wales
State of Origin Series: 2021

Australia
World Cup: 2021

References

External links

Penrith Panthers profile
Panthers profile
NRL profile

1994 births
Living people
Australia national rugby league team players
Australian rugby league players
Country New South Wales Origin rugby league team players
Penrith Panthers players
Penrith Panthers captains
New South Wales Rugby League State of Origin players
Rugby league second-rows
Rugby league centres
Rugby league players from Dubbo
Windsor Wolves players